Rest Energy is a 1980 performance art piece created, enacted, and recorded by performance artist duo Marina Abramović and Ulay in Amsterdam, the Netherlands. Four minutes in duration, Abramović has described it as one of the most difficult pieces she has ever done, saying 

The work is in the collection of the Netherlands Media Art Institute in Amsterdam.

References

External links
 2010 Guardian article about Abramović
 Video excerpt of piece at NMAI

1980 works
Performances
Art duos
New media art
Body art
Performance art
1980 in the Netherlands